The Catholic Church has a population in Kosovo of approximately 65,000 in a region of roughly 2 million people. Another 60,000 Kosovan Catholics are outside the region, mainly for work. They are mainly ethnic Albanians, with a few Croats.

The Diocese of Prizren-Pristina (until 5 September 2018, an Apostolic Administration of Prizren) is the ecclesiastical district of the Catholic Church in Kosovo. It is centered in the city of Prizren. Bishop Dodë Gjergji serves as diocesan bishop . 
, the Holy See does not recognise Kosovo as a sovereign state (see also Holy See's reaction to the 2008 Kosovo declaration of independence).

However, as stated by Bishop Dodë Gjergji, the Kosovan prelate of the Diocese of Prizren-Pristina, in an interview with RTV Dukagjini on December 12, 2020, “The Vatican has two segments: the Vatican as the seat of the Catholic Church and as a state. Pope Francis has raised our church from the Church of Kosovo to the Church of Prizren-Pristina, just like the bishops all over the world. Therefore, religiously we are very fine. The state aspect is a diplomatic aspect.”

Papal nuncio
Archbishop Juliusz Janusz, 66, originally a priest of the Archdiocese of Kraków, Poland, is the Apostolic Nuncio to Slovenia and the Apostolic Delegate to Kosovo; he had served previously as Apostolic Nuncio to Hungary and before that as Apostolic Nuncio to Mozambique and Rwanda. He was delegate from 10 February 2011 to 21 September 2018.

Titular archbishop of Sulci Jean-Marie Speich is Apostolic Nuncio to Slovenia and Apostolic Delegate to Kosovo from 19 March 2019.

History

Middle Ages
After the Great Schism between the east and the west, Albanians who had ties to the Roman church started converting to catholicism. Northern Albanians started to convert to catholicism en masse during the 12th and 13th centuries, including Albanians living in Kosovo. During the late 12th century Kosovo was fully conquered by Stefan Nemanja, thus introducing Serbian Orthodoxy to local Vlachs, Bulgarians and Catholic Albanians. Albanians in Kosovo are reported by Stefan Uroš I, as well as Albanian toponyms in the Drenica valley and Dukagjin plains (1246-1255) and in Rugovo (1292). Most of these Albanians were Roman Catholic.

When Stefan Dečanski founded the Visoki Dečani monastery in 1327, he referred to "villages and katuns of Vlachs and Albanians" in the area of White Drin. King Stefan Dečanski granted the Visoki Dečani monastery with pasture land along with catholic Vlach and Albanian katuns around Drin and Lim rivers of whom had to carry salt and provide serf labour for the monastery. A chrysobull of the Serbian Tsar Stefan Dušan that was given to the Monastery of Saint Mihail and Gavril in Prizren between the years of 1348-1353 states the presence of catholic Albanians in the Plains of Dukagjin, the vicinity of Prizren and in the villages of Drenica. In 1348 a total of 9 Albanian villages are mentioned in the vicinity of Prizren. Albanian catholic communities lived in Novo Brdo and Janjevo alongside Saxon miners and Ragusan merchants. Ragusan documents in the early 14th century mention 150 catholic Albanian household heads living in Novo Brdo with their families. They also mention Albanian communities in Trepça and Prizren. Albanian presence is also mentioned in 14th and 15th century Pristina.

Pope John XXII tried to turn catholic Albanians against Serbian rule, but this didn't succeed. In 1332, an anonomous Dominican priest called for help to liberate "catholic Latins and Albanians who detest Slavic rule" from the Kingdom of Rascia(Serbia). Under the rule Tsar Stefan Dušan catholic Albanians were persecuted and were forcefully converted to Serbian orthodoxy, thus having their names changed to Slavic orthodox names. After the Battle of Kosovo in 1389 Serbian rule in Kosovo started to weaken and Ottoman Islam was first introduced in Kosovo, with the first mosques being built in Pristina, Vučitrn and Prizren. In 1455 Kosovo was fully conquered by the Ottomans, with Novo Brdo falling in 27 of June 1441, Prizren in 21 of June 1455 and Zvečan in 1455, thus ending 157 years of Serbian rule in Kosovo.

Kosovo war (1997-1999)

During the Kosovo war, vandalisation of Kosovo Albanian Catholic churches occurred. The Catholic Church of St Anthony located in Gjakovë had major damage done by Yugoslav Serb soldiers. In Pristina, Yugoslav Serb officers ejected nuns and a priest from the Catholic church of St. Anthony and installed aircraft radar in the steeple.

Modern period 
On 26 November 2019, an earthquake struck Albania. The Catholic Church in Kosovo held mass on 1 December across the country and it collected charitable donations by parishioners for earthquake victims and their families.

One of the oldest Catholic churches in Kosovo is the Catholic church of Vinarc, in Mitrovica.

Churches

See also
 Religion in Kosovo
 Christianity in Kosovo
 Serbian Orthodox Church in Kosovo
 Protestantism in Kosovo
 Kosovo Protestant Evangelical Church (KPEC)
 Laramans, historical community of crypto-Catholics

Notes

References

 
Kosovo